The 2019 Northwest Territories general election was held on October 1, 2019. Nineteen members were elected to the Legislative Assembly of the Northwest Territories.

Election
On September 6, 2019, Premier Bob McLeod announced that he would not seek re-election. 

Four other incumbents announced they would not seek re-election, including three of seven cabinet ministers — Health Minister Glen Abernethy, Housing Minister Alfred Moses, and Finance Minister Robert C. McLeod.

Not counting the three acclaimed MLAs (RJ Simpson, Frederick Blake Jr, and Jackson Lafferty), only four incumbent members out of 11 running won reelection: Kevin O'Reilly, Julie Green, Shane Thompson, and Caroline Cochrane. Cochrane was the only cabinet minister from the 18th Assembly to return to the legislature. Three ridings, including Cochrane's, were subject to automatic recounts due to the narrow margins of victory; however, all of the recounts upheld the original results.

The election represented a historic breakthrough for women in Northwest Territories politics. The territory had just two female MLAs in the previous assembly, ranking last among all of Canada's elected legislatures for female representation; in the 2019 election, however, the territory elected nine women, representing nearly half of the 19-seat legislature— the highest percentage of female representation in any Canadian legislature.

New premier and cabinet
Given that the territory operates on a consensus government system, MLAs elected on October 1 chose the new premier in the first session of the 19th Assembly. Four MLAs — Jackson Lafferty, R. J. Simpson, Caroline Cochrane and Frieda Martselos — indicated that they would stand for the premiership; Cochrane was selected as the premier on October 24.

Simpson, Paulie Chinna, Katrina Nokleby, Diane Thom, Shane Thompson and Caroline Wawzonek were selected as the cabinet members in the same session of the legislature.

Results
The Legislative Assembly is run on a consensus government system, in which all MLAs sit as independents and are not organized into political parties. Note, accordingly, that colours in the following charts are used solely to indicate candidate status, not political party affiliations.

Statistics

Candidates

References

External links
Elections NWT

Elections in the Northwest Territories
Northwest Territories
October 2019 events in Canada
2019 in the Northwest Territories